Cherni Osam is a village in Troyan Municipality, Lovech Province, northern Bulgaria.

On September 8, 2012 the neighboring village of Zheravitsa was incorporated into the settlement.

References

Villages in Lovech Province